The Bristol Concert was a collaboration between the British free jazz quartet Mujician (plus vocalist Julie Tippetts) and The Georgian Ensemble, an 11-piece group from Georgia.  The concert programme featured compositions by Keith Tippett, who also acted as musical director for the collaboration and played piano.

The concert was recorded and broadcast by the BBC in 1991.  A CD was issued in 2000 by What! Disc, a now-defunct subsidiary of Voiceprint.  The artwork is a reproduction of a woodcut by Mujician member Paul Dunmall.  This edition is out-of-print.

A 2CD budget-package called The Best of Keith Tippett & Julie Tippetts was produced by Deja Vu in 2005, consisting of The Bristol Concert on the first disc and the Couple In Spirit II album on the second CD.  This edition neglects to include musician credits and the track listing is incorrect; the medley piece 'Dedicated to Mingus/Tortworth Oak' is incorrectly credited as two separate tracks and 'Septober Energy' is not listed.  The artwork by Dunmall is not licensed to this edition and is therefore not included.

Track listing

"Brass Wind Bells"
"Thoughts to Geoff"
"Dedicated to Mingus/Tortworth Oak"
"A Loose Kite"
"Slowly The Sunrise"
"Cider Dance"
"The Irish Girl’s Tear"
"Septober Energy"

All compositions by Keith Tippett
Recorded live at St George's in Bristol (UK), 1 June 1991

Personnel

Mujician:
Keith Tippett - piano, conductor
Paul Dunmall - soprano/tenor saxophone
Paul Rogers - double bass
Tony Levin - drums
Julie Tippetts - voice

The Georgian Ensemble:
Enver Khmirev - trumpet
Dmitri Saladze - trumpet
Vakhtang Sirbiladze - trumpet
Roman Pogoev - trombone
Grigol Meladze - trombone
George Beridze - alto saxophone
George Bagdasarov - alto saxophone
Chabuki Amiranashvili - tenor saxophone
David Masteranov - guitar
Manana Meladze - voice
Maya Tsitladze - voice

External links
The Bristol Concert - European Free Improvisation Pages: http://www.efi.group.shef.ac.uk/labels/voicep/what7.html
The Bristol Concert - AllMusic: http://www.allmusic.com/album/bristol-concert-mw0000758404

References

2000 albums
Jazz albums by British artists
Collaborative albums